Tropidocoryphidae is an extinct family of trilobites in the order Proetida.

Genera
These 44 genera belong to the family Tropidocoryphidae:

 Aidynsaia Owens & Ivanova, 2010
 Alberticoryphe Erben, 1966
 Astycoryphe Richter 1919
 Bojocoryphe Snajdr, 1976
 Buchiproetus Pillet, 1969
 Centriproetus Snajdr, 1977
 Cirriticeps Holloway, 2013
 Cornuproetus Richter & Richter 1919
 Cyrtosymboloides Alberti, 1967
 Dalejeproetus Snajdr, 1977
 Denemarkia Pribyl 1946
 Diademaproetus Alberti, 1964
 Eopiriproetus Alberti, 1966
 Galbertianus Özdikmen, 2006
 Ignoproetus Snajdr, 1977
 Interproetus Snajdr 1977
 Koneprusites Pribyl 1964
 Lepidoproetus Erben, 1951
 Lodenicia Prantl & Vanek, 1958
 Macroblepharum Alberti, 1964
 Metaxaphorus Owens & Ivanova, 2010
 Miriproetus Snajdr, 1977
 Nagaproetus Snajdr, 1977
 Phaetonellus Novák, 1890
 Piriproetus Erben, 1952
 Pribylia
 Prionopeltis Hawle & Corda 1847
 Prodrevermannia Alberti, 1964
 Proetina Pribyl, 1946
 Proetopeltis Pribyl 1965
 Pteroparia Richter, 1913
 Quadratoproetus Alberti, 1967
 Rabuloproetus Snajdr, 1977
 Ranunculoproetus Snajdr, 1977
 Rokycanocoryphe Pribyl & Vanek, 1987
 Sculptoproetus Erben 1951
 Stenoblepharum Owens, 1973
 Tafilaltaspis Alberti, 1966
 Tropicoryphe Snajdr, 1977
 Tropidocoryphe Novák, 1890
 Vicinoproetus Alberti, 1967
 Voigtaspis Alberti, 1967
 Wolayella Erben, 1966
 Xiphogonium Hawle & Corda, 1847

References

Proetida
Trilobite families